is a communications and observation tower in the Shiba-koen district of Minato, Tokyo, Japan, built in 1958. At , it is the second-tallest structure in Japan. The structure is an Eiffel Tower-inspired lattice tower that is painted white and international orange to comply with air safety regulations.
 
The tower's main sources of income are tourism and antenna leasing. Over 150 million people have visited the tower. FootTown, a four-story building directly under the tower, houses museums, restaurants, and shops. Departing from there, guests can visit two observation decks. The names were changed following renovation of the top deck in 2018. The tower is repainted every five years, taking a year to complete the process.

In 1961, transmission antennae were added to the tower. They are used for radio and television broadcasting and now broadcast signals for Japanese media outlets such as NHK, TBS, and Fuji TV. The height of the tower was not suitable for Japan's planned terrestrial digital broadcasting planned for July 2011 for the Tokyo area. A taller digital broadcasting tower, known as Tokyo Skytree, was completed on 29 February 2012.

Since its completion in 1958, Tokyo Tower has become a prominent landmark in the city, and frequently appears in media set in Tokyo.

Construction

A large broadcasting tower was needed in the Kantō region after NHK, Japan's public broadcasting station, began television broadcasting in 1953. Private broadcasting companies began operating in the months following the construction of NHK's own transmission tower. This communications boom led the Japanese government to believe that transmission towers would soon be built all over Tokyo, eventually overrunning the city. The proposed solution was the construction of one large tower capable of transmitting to the entire region. Furthermore, because of the country's postwar boom in the 1950s, Japan was searching for a monument to symbolize its ascendancy as a global economic powerhouse.

Hisakichi Maeda, founder and president of Nippon Denpatō, the tower's owner and operator, originally planned for the tower to be taller than the Empire State Building, which at 381 meters was the highest structure in the world. However, the plan fell through because of the lack of both funds and materials.

Tachū Naitō, renowned designer of tall buildings in Japan, was chosen to design the newly proposed tower. Looking to the Western world for inspiration, Naitō based his design on the Eiffel Tower in Paris, France.

The new construction project attracted hundreds of tobi (鳶), traditional Japanese construction workers who specialized in the construction of high-rise structures. The Takenaka Corporation broke ground in June 1957 and each day at least 400 laborers worked on the tower. It was constructed of steel, a third of which was scrap metal taken from US tanks damaged in the Korean War. When the 90-meter-long antenna was bolted into place on 14 October 1958, Tokyo Tower was the tallest freestanding tower in the world, taking the title from the Eiffel Tower by nine meters. 

Despite being taller than the Eiffel Tower, Tokyo Tower only weighs about 4,000 tons, 3,300 tons less than the Eiffel Tower. While other towers have since surpassed Tokyo Tower's height, it remained the tallest artificial structure in Japan until April 2010, when it was surpassed by the Tokyo Skytree. It was opened to the public on 23 December 1958 at a final cost of ¥2.8 billion ($8.4 million in 1958). Tokyo Tower was mortgaged for ¥10 billion in 2000.

Planned as an antenna for telecommunications and brightly colored in accordance with the time's Aviation Law, the tower's two panoramic observatories are mostly frequented by tourists today; the tower constitutes a clear reference point in the center's chaotic skyline, forming a strong landmark, both night and day.

Maintenance
Every five years, the tower is repainted in a process that takes about a year to complete. Tokyo Tower is next planned to be repainted in 2024.

Functions 

Tokyo Tower's two main revenue sources are antenna leasing and tourism. It functions as a radio and television broadcasting antenna support structure and is a tourist destination that houses several different attractions. Over 150 million people have visited the tower in total since its opening in late 1958. Tower attendance had been steadily declining until it bottomed out at 2.3 million in 2000. Since then, attendance has been rising, and it has recently been attracting approximately three million visitors per year.

The first area tourists visit upon reaching the tower is FootTown, a four-story building stationed directly under the tower. There, visitors can eat, shop, and visit several museums and galleries. Elevators that depart from the first floor of FootTown can be used to reach the first of two observation decks, the two-story Main Observatory. For the price of another ticket, visitors can board another set of elevators from the second floor of the Main Observatory to reach the final observation deck—the Special Observatory.

Broadcasting 

Tokyo Tower, a member of the World Federation of Great Towers, has been used by many organizations for broadcasting purposes. The structure was intended for broadcasting television, but radio antennas were installed in 1961 because it could accommodate them. While analog and digital television broadcasts are no longer conducted from the site, two FM radio stations remain on Tokyo Tower. Stations that use or have used the tower's antenna include:

Current
Tokyo FM (JOAU-FM): 80.0MHz
InterFM (JODW-FM): 89.7MHz 

Former
NHK General TV Tokyo (JOAK-TV): VHF Channel 1 (Analog)
NHK Educational TV Tokyo (JOAB-TV): VHF Channel 3 (Analog)
Nippon Television Tokyo (JOAX-TV): VHF Channel 4 (Analog)
Tokyo Broadcasting System Television (JORX-TV): TBS Television/VHF Channel 6 (Analog)
Fuji Television Tokyo (JOCX-TV): Fuji Television Analog/VHF Channel 8 (Analog)
TV Asahi Tokyo (JOEX-TV): TV Asahi Analog Television/VHF Channel 10 (Analog)
TV Tokyo (JOTX-TV): VHF Channel 12 (Analog)
Tokyo Metropolitan Television (JOMX-TV): UHF Channel 14 (Analog)
The University of the Air TV (JOUD-TV): UHF Channel 16 (Analog)
The University of the Air-FM (JOUD-FM): 77.1MHz
J-Wave (JOAV-FM): 81.3MHz
NHK Radio FM Tokyo (JOAK-FM): 82.5MHz

Japan employs both analog and digital broadcasting. In July 2011 all television broadcasting was changed to solely digital. Tokyo Tower is not a reliable broadcasting antenna for completely digital broadcasting because the tower is not tall enough to transmit the higher frequency waves to areas surrounded by forests or high-rise buildings. As an alternative, a new 634-meter-tall (2,080 ft) tower called the Tokyo Skytree was opened in 2012. In an attempt to make Tokyo Tower more appealing to NHK and the five other commercial broadcasters who planned to move their transmitting stations to the new tower, Nihon Denpatō officials drafted a plan to extend its digital broadcasting antenna by 80 to 100 meters at a cost of approximately ¥4 billion (US$50 million). 

As a result of their move to the Skytree, only one digital television station remained on Tokyo Tower: that of the Open University of Japan, whose JOUD-DTV and JOUD-FM continued on the tower until shutting down in 2018. FM radio stations will continue to use the tower for broadcasting in the Tokyo area. Masahiro Kawada, the tower's planning director, raised the possibility of the tower becoming a backup for the Tokyo Skytree, depending on what the TV broadcasters want or need.

The antenna's tip was damaged on 11 March 2011 by the Tōhoku earthquake. On 19 July 2012, the Tokyo Tower's height shrank to 315 meters while the top antenna was repaired for damage from the earthquake.

Attractions

FootTown 
Located in the base of the tower is a 4-story building known as FootTown. The first floor includes the Aquarium Gallery, a reception hall, the 400-person-capacity "Tower Restaurant", a FamilyMart convenience store and a souvenir shop. This floor's main attractions, however, are the three elevators that serve as a direct ride to the Main Observatory. The second floor is primarily a food and shopping area. In addition to the five standalone restaurants, the second floor's food court consists of four restaurants, including a McDonald's and a Pizza-La.

FootTown's third and fourth floors house several tourist attractions. The third floor is home to the Guinness World Records Museum Tokyo, a museum that houses life-size figures, photo panels and memorabilia depicting interesting records that have been authenticated by the Guinness Book. The Tokyo Tower Wax Museum, opened in 1970, displays wax figures imported from London where they were made. 

The figures on display range from pop culture icons such as The Beatles to religious figures such as Jesus Christ. A hologram gallery named the Gallery DeLux, a lounge and a few specialty stores are also located on this floor. Tokyo Tower's Trick Art Gallery is located on the building's fourth and final floor. This gallery displays optical illusions, including paintings and objects that visitors can interact with.

On the roof of the FootTown building is a small amusement park that contains several small rides and hosts live performances for children. On weekends and holidays, visitors can use the roof to access the tower's outside stairwell. At approximately 660 steps, the stairwell is an alternative to the tower's elevators and leads directly to the Main Observatory.

Tokyo One Piece Tower 

Based on the hit manga and anime One Piece, Tokyo Tower featured a small One Piece themed amusement park that opened in 2015 and closed in 2020. The amusement park offered a range of attractions, shops, and restaurants, all based on the characters from Eiichiro Oda's manga. Patrons enjoyed various games or attractions based on their favorite characters and enjoyed meals from the world of One Piece. There was a gift store that features exclusive goods for One Piece fans.

Appearance 

Before the tower's 30th anniversary in 1987, the only lighting on the tower were light bulbs located on the corner contours that extended from the base to the antenna. In the spring of 1987, Nihon Denpatō invited lighting designer Motoko Ishii to visit the tower. Since its opening 30 years earlier, the tower's annual ticket sales had dropped significantly, and in a bid to revitalize the tower and again establish it as an important tourist attraction and symbol of Tokyo, Ishii was hired to redesign Tokyo Tower's lighting arrangement.

Unveiled in 1989, the new lighting arrangement required the removal of the contour-outlining light bulbs and the installation of 176 floodlights in and around the tower's frame. From dusk to midnight, the floodlights illuminate the entire tower. Sodium vapor lamps are used from 2 October to 6 July to cover the tower in an orange color. From 7 July to 1 October, the lights are changed to metal halide lamps to illuminate the tower with a white color. The reasoning behind the change is a seasonal one. Ishii reasoned that orange is a warmer color and helps to offset the cold winter months. Conversely, white is thought a cool color that helps during the hot summer months.

Occasionally, Tokyo Tower's lighting is changed to specific arrangements for special events. The tower is specially lit for some annual events.
Since 2000, the entire tower has been illuminated in a pink light on 1 October to highlight the beginning of National Breast Cancer Awareness Month. The tower has also had a variety of special lighting arrangements for Christmas since 1994. During New Year's Eve, the tower lights up at midnight with a year number displayed on one side of the observatory to mark the arrival of the new year.  

Special Japanese events have been cause to light the tower in several non-traditional ways. In 2002, alternating sections of the tower were lit blue to help celebrate the opening of the FIFA World Cup in Japan. Alternating sections of the tower were lit green on Saint Patrick's Day in 2007 to commemorate the 50th anniversary of Japanese–Irish relations. On a few occasions, Tokyo Tower has even been specially lit to correspond with corporate events. For example, the top half of the tower was lit green to correspond with the Japanese premiere of The Matrix Reloaded and different sections of the tower were lit red, white and black to commemorate the first day of sales of Coca-Cola C2. 

The tower was lit for the new millennium in 2000 with Motoko Ishii again reprising her role as the designer. In December 2008, Nihon Denpatō spent $6.5 million to create a new night-time illumination scheme—titled the "Diamond Veil"—to celebrate the tower's 50th anniversary. The arrangement featured 276 lights in seven colors equally distributed across the towers four faces.

When employing specialty lighting on the tower, the Main Observatory often plays an important role. During the second international "White Band Day" on 10 September 2005, the tower was completely unlit except for the Main Observatory, which was lit with a bright white light. The resulting white ring represented the White Band referenced in the day's name. The two floors of windows that make up the exterior of the Main Observatory are utilized to display words or numbers. When the tower employed lighting to commemorate terrestrial digital broadcasting first being available in the Kantō region on 1 December 2005, each side of the Main Observatory displayed the characters  (chi deji, an abbreviation for  chijō dejitaru hōsō  terrestrial digital broadcasting). More recently, the observatory displayed both "TOKYO" and "2016" to stress Tokyo's 2016 Olympic bid. Primitive images, such as hearts, have also been displayed using the observatory's windows.

Renovation
Operations at The Tokyo Tower Top Deck (at the height of 250 m) suspended operations in 2016. The Top Deck reopened on March 3, 2018. At that time, Tokyo tower also announced the renaming of both decks. Renovations on the main deck, which began in September 2016, caused partial closure of the deck.

Mascots

The Tokyo Tower has two mascots named ノッポン Noppon. They are two brothers: Older Brother, who wears blue dungarees, and Younger Brother, who wears red dungarees. They were unveiled on 23 December 1998 to celebrate the 40th anniversary of the Tokyo Tower.

Media representation of Tokyo Tower 

Just as the Eiffel Tower is often used in popular culture to immediately locate a scene in Paris, France, the Tokyo Tower is often used in the same way for Tokyo.

It is used in anime and manga such as Doraemon, Tokyo Magnitude 8.0, Magic Knight Rayearth, Please Save My Earth, Cardcaptor Sakura, Digimon, Detective Conan, Sailor Moon, Tenchi Muyo! and Death Note. The tower is frequently used in the Japanese kaiju (giant monster) film genre. It has been the location of numerous battles and visitations by Godzilla, Mothra, Gamera and King Kong (King Kong Escapes) wherein it is frequently destroyed and rebuilt. 

Based on the popular manga series by Ryōhei Saigan, the 2005 film Always Sanchōme no Yūhi was a nostalgic view of life in the neighborhoods beneath the construction of the Tokyo Tower. In the 2022 film Bubble, it is depicted as being destroyed by the titular reality-breaking bubbles.

Gallery

See also

 Nagoya TV Tower
 Sapporo TV Tower
 Media of Japan
 List of tallest freestanding structures
 List of tallest freestanding steel structures
 List of tallest towers
 List of transmission sites
 Lattice tower

References

External links

Tokyo Tower official site (English)

Towers completed in 1958
Eiffel Tower reproductions
Landmarks in Japan
Buildings and structures in Minato, Tokyo
Observation towers in Japan
Tourist attractions in Tokyo
Iron and steel buildings
1958 establishments in Japan
Lattice towers